Academy of Kraków (Cracow) or Kraków (Cracow) Academy most often refers to Jagiellonian University, the most famous of the universities of Kraków, Poland, and which held the official name of Akademia Krakowska from the Middle Ages until the Eighteenth century. However the term can be also applied to some more modern universities and academies in Kraków which use or used the name 'academy' in their title, particularly:
Academy of Fine Arts in Kraków
Cracow University of Economics
Academy of Music in Kraków